Dennis Edward Stewart (born April 11, 1947) is an American former professional basketball player.

College career
Stewart played college basketball at the University of Michigan, where he played with the  Michigan Wolverines.

Professional career
Stewart was selected in the 1969 NBA draft, by the Phoenix Suns. Although Stewart never played for the Suns, he did play in the NBA with the Baltimore Bullets. He also played in the American Basketball Association (ABA), Continental Basketball Association (CBA), and abroad in France. Stewart was a CBA All-Star in 1971–72, when he averaged 31 points per game for the Grand Rapids Tackers. He was the French League Best Scorer, in 1974. Stewart's professional career spanned from 1970 to 1979.

References

External links
The Draft Review profile

1947 births
Living people
American expatriate basketball people in France
Baltimore Bullets (1963–1973) players
Basketball players from Pennsylvania
JA Vichy players
Lancaster Red Roses (CBA) players
Los Angeles Stars draft picks
Miami Floridians players
Michigan Wolverines men's basketball players
Phoenix Suns draft picks
Wilkes-Barre Barons players
American men's basketball players
Forwards (basketball)